44 Montgomery is a 43-story,  office skyscraper in the heart of San Francisco's Financial District. Groundbreaking was in the spring of 1964. When completed in 1967, it was the tallest building west of Dallas, surpassed by 555 California Street (built as the world headquarters of Bank of America) in 1969. The building was designed, built and dedicated for Wells Fargo Bank, and their IT subsidiary was based there at one time (the bank's headquarters are at 464 California Street). 

44 Montgomery, as part of the original design anticipating the then-under-construction Bay Area Rapid Transit subway system, contains direct underground access to the Montgomery Street Station.

History
The State Teachers Retirement System of Ohio purchased the building from AT&T in 1997 for $111 million. In 2017, Beacon Capital purchased it for $473 million.

Tenants 
 U.S. Securities and Exchange Commission
 Locke Lord
 Alpha Omega Financial Systems
 AppleOne Employment Services
 Armanino LLP
 Invest Northern Ireland
 Northwestern University
 Signature Consultants
 Seagate Properties, Inc.
 Landrum & Brown
 RSM US LLP
 ContractPodAi

See also

List of tallest buildings in San Francisco

References

External links
44 Montgomery Street official website

Financial District, San Francisco
Office buildings completed in 1967
Skyscraper office buildings in San Francisco